Narsingdi District is a district in central Bangladesh. It is located 50 km north-east of Dhaka, capital city of Bangladesh. It is a part of the Dhaka Division. The district is famous for its textile craft industry. Narsingdi is bordered by Kishoreganj in the north and north-east, Brahmanbaria in the east and south-east, Narayanganj in the south and south-west and Gazipur in the west.

Subdivisions
There are six upazilas, or subdivisions, in the Narsingdi district.
 Belabo Upazila
 Monohardi Upazila
 Narsingdi Sadar Upazila
 Palash Upazila
 Raipura Upazila
 Shibpur Upazila

Sightseeing
 
 Dream Holiday Park
 Heritage Resort

Economy
Narsingdi is a densely industrial area and is home to many textile mills. Narsingdi gas field is located in the Shibpur upazila under Narsingdi district adjacent to the Dhaka-Sylhet highway about 45 km away of northern most east direction from capital city of Bangladesh, Dhaka. This field was discovered by Petrobangla in 1990. Commercial gas production was started in 1996 and until 31 August 2006 total  or 30.84 percent of gas reserves has been recovered. Largest powerplant of Bangladesh, Ghorashal power plant, owned by Bangladesh Power Development Board (PDB) is situated in palash Upazilla. Narsingdi is riched by several number of jute mills, which plays an important role in the economy. Quality banana is also found here. The biggest and renowned HAAT (textile market) of Bangladesh is located here at Madhabdi which is known as Shekherchaur / Babur Haat. Sugarcane also grows well. There is a sugar mill in Palash Thana named Deshbondho sugar mill. There are two urea fertilizer industries in Palash and Hhorashal.-->

Demographics

According to the 2011 Bangladesh census, Narsingdi district had a population was 2,224,944, of which 1,102,943 were males and 1,122,001 females. Rural population was 1,777,299 (79.88%) while the urban population was 447,645 (20.12%). Narsingdi district had a literacy rate of 49.60% for the population 7 years and above: 50.56% for males and 48.86% for females.

Muslims make up 94.33% of the population, while Hindus are 5.65% of the population.

Rivers
The Meghna, the Shitalakshya, the old Brahmaputra, Arial Kha, Haridhoa, and Paharea are some of the main rivers that flow through this district.

Gallery

See also
 Districts of Bangladesh
 Dhaka Division

Notes

References

Shakhawat H Bhuiyan ( Database Engineer US Airforce, USA)

External links

 www.narsingdi.gov.bd
 

 
Districts of Bangladesh